Glascock County Courthouse is a courthouse on Main Street in Gibson, Georgia, the county seat of Glascock County. The first county courthouse was built in 1858 with a donation from William Gibson, namesake of the county seat. It was removed for use as a residence when the currently used courthouse was built in 1919. The courthouse was designed by J.W. McMillian & Son. It was added to the National Register of Historic Places on September 18, 1980.

See also

National Register of Historic Places listings in Glascock County, Georgia

References

Courthouses on the National Register of Historic Places in Georgia (U.S. state)
County courthouses in Georgia (U.S. state)
Buildings and structures in Glascock County, Georgia
1858 establishments in Georgia (U.S. state)
Government buildings completed in 1919
National Register of Historic Places in Glascock County, Georgia